Vincenzo "Vin" Catoggio (born 13 May 1954) is a former Australian rules footballer in the Victorian Football League. He was noted for his outrageous afro haircut and because of this was considered one of the real characters of the game. He is of Italian descent and played for three VFL clubs.

Family
He is the second son of the five children of Leonardo and Rocchina Catoggio.  Leonardo arrived in Australia in 1938, and Rocchina in 1936. Both Vin's grandfathers  Carmine, and Vincenzo  arrived together in Australia, from Montemurro, Italy, in 1927, and their families arrived later.

Vin married Victoria Watson in 1982. They have two sons and one daughter.

Football
In 1972 he won the Morrish Medal which was awarded to the player voted best and fairest in the VFL 19s.

In 1973 he won the Gardiner Medal which was awarded to the best and fairest player as adjudged by field umpires in the reserves competition. His first full game of VFL league football came in the 1973 VFL Grand Final.  However, in 1974 he didn't play any games in the league side. In total he played 70 reserves games during his career.

In 1977 he moved Western Australia to play for Subiaco in the West Australian Football League (WAFL), but returned to Carlton in 1978.

Catoggio moved to Melbourne in 1981 as part of a deal that recruited Greg Wells to Carlton and played nine games over two years.

After football
After retiring from playing football he became a painter.

References

External links
 
 
 Vincent (Vin) Catoggio, at WAFL Footy Facts''.
 Vinny Catoggio Biography at Blueseum.org
 Demon Wiki profile
 Vincent Cattogio (sic), at The VFA Project — note that the "Cattogio" who played for Preston in 1963 was Catoggio's uncle.

1954 births
Living people
Australian people of Italian descent
Australian rules footballers from Victoria (Australia)
Carlton Football Club players
Subiaco Football Club players
Melbourne Football Club players
Sydney Swans players
Prahran Football Club players
Brunswick Football Club players